The 1978 season was the Minnesota Vikings' 18th in the National Football League. The Vikings finished with an 8–7–1 record, and finished in first place in the NFC Central division, despite having a regular season point differential of −12. The team appeared in the playoffs for the 10th time in 11 years; as in each of their previous playoff seasons, this one ended with a loss. Following the season, longtime quarterback Fran Tarkenton retired.

Offseason

1978 Draft

 The Vikings traded their fifth-round selection (132nd overall) to the New York Giants in exchange for TE Bob Tucker.
 The Vikings traded their sixth-round selection (159th overall) to the San Francisco 49ers in exchange for DBs Windlan Hill and Nate Allen.
 The Vikings traded their seventh-round selection (186th overall) to the Philadelphia Eagles in exchange for S Bill Bradley. 
 The Vikings traded CB Autry Beamon and LB Amos Martin to the Seattle Seahawks in exchange for Seattle's eighth-round selection (204th overall).
 The Vikings traded their eighth-round selection (213th overall) and 1979 10th-round selection (263rd overall) to the New York Jets in exchange for S Phil Wise.

Roster

Preseason

Regular season

Game summaries

Week 8: vs Green Bay Packers

The Vikings won a game they had to win in their bid to win a 10th NFC Central division title in 11 seasons, as Fran Tarkenton completed 26 of 43 passes for 262 yards and three touchdowns, two of them to Ahmad Rashad. "That's pretty amazing for a guy who can't throw a football anymore, isn't it?" said the 38-year-old Tarkenton, who raised his 18-year yardage total to 45,143, the first man to surpass 45,000 yards. Tarkenton's third scoring strike to running back Chuck Foreman just before the half went for 16 yards. Terdell Middleton, who entered the game as the NFC's third leading rusher, scored Green Bay's only touchdown on a 3-yard run midway through the second quarter, giving Green Bay a 7–7 tie. He finished the game with 81 yards on 15 carries.

Standings

Playoffs

In 2004, Football Outsiders named the 1978 Vikings as one of the "worst playoff teams ever".

Awards and records
 QB Fran Tarkenton threw 32 interceptions on the season, surpassing his own franchise record of 25 (set in 1962)
 RB Rickey Young led the league with 88 receptions, setting a Vikings single-season record.

Statistical leaders

League rankings

References

Minnesota Vikings seasons
Minnesota
NFC Central championship seasons
Minnesota Vikings